This was the first edition of the tournament

Gilles Müller won the title, defeating John-Patrick Smith in the final, 6–3, 6–3.

Seeds

Draw

Finals

Top half

Bottom half

References
 Main Draw
 Qualifying Draw

Santaizi ATP Challenger - Singles
2014 Singles